13i (or Canal 13 Internacional) is a Chilean pay television channel, that was launched as Canal 13's international broadcasting service.

History 
Its programming consists of direct live broadcasts from channel 13 of Santiago, with additional news bulletins and programmes especially produced for the international feed.

From 1995 until 2001, Canal 13 has an international channel, called UCTV Chile, which was rebranded as 13i on 30 June 2014, available as both a pay television channel and a subscription-based online livestream.

Programming 
 Teletrece AM
 Bienvenidos
 Teletrece Tarde
 La Reina de Franklin (upcoming)
 Teletrece
 Pacto de Sangre
 Contra Viento y Marea
 En su propia trampa
 Los 80
 Teletrece Noche
 Sábado de reportajes
 Vértigo
 Viva el lunes
 Martes 13
 Mediomundo
 Venga conmigo
 Papi Ricky
 Las Vega's
 Primera dama
 Si se la puede, gana
 Los clásicos del 13
 T13 Regional

External links 
  

Canal 13 (Chilean TV channel)
Television networks in Chile
Television stations in Chile
Spanish-language television stations
Television channels and stations established in 2014
International broadcasters